The following are the national records in athletics in Laos maintained by the Lao Amateur Athletic Federation (LAAF).

Outdoor

Key to tables:

ht = hand timing

A = affected by altitude

NWI = no wind measurement

OT = oversized track (> 200m in circumference)

Men

Women

Indoor

Men

Women

ht = hand timing

References

Laos
Records
Athletics